Robinhood : Prince Of Thieves, simply known as Robin Hood, is a 2009 Indian Malayalam-language neo-noir action thriller film directed by Joshiy and written by Sachi-Sethu. The film stars Prithviraj Sukumaran, Narain, Jayasurya, Bhavana and Biju Menon. It was released on 24 September 2009.

Synopsis
Venki is an entrance coaching professor by day and robs automated teller machines (ATMs) using fake debit cards by night. He has been operating out of Kochi for the past three months and the Imperial Bank of India (IBI) is the target of all these robberies.

ACP Harris is in charge of the investigation. But the managing director of the bank, Nandakumar Menon, is not happy with the way the investigations are proceeding as the cops have been harassing the bank's customers. The bank authorities have ruled out a problem in their systems as the same system is used by other banks. The other banks are not yet a target. All the transactions done by the robber have been using a debit card.

Nandakumar Menon decides to conduct an investigation in parallel with the cops. He summons a private Detective Alexander Felix. Felix is an unkempt young man who opted out of IPS. On the first day, he oversleeps on the train and does not disembark at Kochi. But appearances are deceptive. Beneath the surface, Felix is a sharp investigator. In order to assist him, the bank also appoints a senior systems manager, Roopa. Felix and Roopa move into the IBI guesthouse, which is right across from Venki's apartment. Slowly, the trio begins a friendship. The rest of the story focuses on what happens to the three friends, how Felix succeeds in finding the ATM thief and what is the story behind Venki's hatred towards IBI forms rest of the story.

Cast
Prithviraj Sukumaran as Siddharth (Siddhu) / Venkitesh Iyer (Venki)
Narain as Alexander Felix
Jayasurya as ACP Harris Mohammed
Bhavana as Roopalakshmi
Biju Menon as T. Nandakumar Menon, Chairman of IBI Bank and 2Day Builders
P. Sreekumar as Sundaram (IBI Bank Zonal Manager), Abhirami's father
Lena as Meera
Samvritha Sunil as Abhirami Sundaram
Salim Kumar as Nassar
Janardhanan as Vaidyanathan IAS, Siddharth's father
Jaffar Idukki as Sunny 
Nandhu Podhuval as Govindan, Minister's P.A
Shobha Mohan as Radhika, Siddharth's mother
T. P. Madhavan as Minister Manjooran
Pratheesh Nandan as Jithesh
Pawan as Local goon
Chali Pala as Police Officer Sukumaran
Anil Murali as Police Officer Gopi
Sudhi Koppa as Bike Passenger Anil
Vysakh as Channel reporter

Soundtrack
Music: M. Jayachandran; lyrics: Kaithapram Damodaran

 "Jaalam Maayaajaalam" - Shaan, Abu Murali
 "Parannu Vanna Painkili" - Benny Dayal, Achu, Suchithra
 "Ponnalle" - Jassie Gift
 "Priyanu Matram" - Shweta Mohan, Vijay Yesudas

References

External links
 

2009 films
2000s Malayalam-language films
2009 crime thriller films
Indian crime thriller films
Indian heist films
Fictional portrayals of the Kerala Police
Films shot in Kochi
Films directed by Joshiy
2000s heist films
Films scored by M. Jayachandran